Superdog may refer to:
 Krypto, also known as Krypto the Superdog, Superman's pet dog in various Superman comics
 Krypto the Superdog, an American animated television series
 Superdawg, a drive-in hot dog stand in Chicago